Cheryl Mazzariello Hooker (born February 15, 1950) is an American politician. She has served in the Vermont Senate from the Rutland district since 2019. She previously served in the Vermont Senate from 1997 to 1999 and several terms in the Vermont House of Representatives.

Biography 
Cheryl Mazzariello Hooker is a lifelong resident of Rutland. She graduated from Mount Saint Joseph Academy and Castleton State College. She and her husband George have four children (Sam, Molly, Emily and T.J) and six grandchildren.

Hooker is a retired middle school and high schoolteacher and spends her time with family and friends and volunteers at the Rutland Free Library, The Rutland Community Cupboard, Rutland Dismas House and her church.

Political career 
From 1999 to 2002, Hooker served on the Rutland City Board of Aldermen. She also served in the Vermont House of Representatives (1990-1991, 1993-1995, 2000, 2001-2003) and Vermont Senate (1997-1999). In 2018, she was again elected to the Vermont Senate, and she was reelected in 2020.

Hooker serves as the Clerk of the Senate Committee on Economic Development, Housing, and General Affairs and as the Clerk of the Senate Committee on Institutions. She is a member of the Senate Sexual Harassment Panel. Hooker is one of three state senators serving on the Judicial Nominating Board.

In December 2020, Hooker was selected to serve as Majority Whip for the 2021-2022 session.

References

1950 births
Living people
People from Rutland (city), Vermont
Democratic Party members of the Vermont House of Representatives
Democratic Party Vermont state senators
Women state legislators in Vermont
21st-century American politicians
21st-century American women politicians